Thanatophilus is a genus of carrion beetles in the family Silphidae. There are about 12 described species in Thanatophilus.

Species
These 12 species belong to the genus Thanatophilus:

 Thanatophilus coloradensis (Wickham, 1902)
 Thanatophilus dispar (Herbst, 1793)
 Thanatophilus ferrugatus (Solsky, 1874)
 Thanatophilus lapponicus (Herbst, 1793) (northern carrion beetle)
 Thanatophilus ruficornis (Kuster, 1851)
 Thanatophilus rugosus (Linnaeus, 1758)
 Thanatophilus sagax (Mannerheim, 1853)
 Thanatophilus sinuatus (Fabricius, 1775)
 Thanatophilus terminatus (Hummel, 1825)
 Thanatophilus trituberculatus (Kirby, 1837)
 Thanatophilus truncatus (Say, 1823)
 Thanatophilus uralensis Kozminykh, 1994

References

Further reading

External links

 

Silphidae
Articles created by Qbugbot